Ashland High School was a rural public kindergarten-grade 12 primary and secondary school located in the Ashland, Natchitoches Parish, Louisiana from 1907 until its closing in 1981.

Ashland children now go to school in Goldonna, Louisiana and Campti, Louisiana.

References

Defunct high schools in Louisiana
Schools in Natchitoches Parish, Louisiana
Educational institutions established in 1907
Educational institutions disestablished in 1981
1907 establishments in Louisiana
1981 disestablishments in Louisiana